Henry Adams Bullard (September 9, 1788 – April 17, 1851) was a member of the U.S. House of Representatives representing the state of Louisiana. He served two terms as a National Republican and one as a Whig.

Biography 
Bullard was born in Pepperell, Massachusetts, graduated from Harvard, and studied law in Boston and Philadelphia. In Louisiana, he resided in Natchitoches, where he practiced law, and in Alexandria, as well as in New Orleans.

He accompanied General José Álvarez de Toledo y Dubois on his military expedition into Spanish Texas in 1813.

Congress 
He was later elected as an anti-Jacksonian to the 22nd and 23rd Congresses, resigned in 1834, and later served as a Whig in the 31st Congress.

Career 
Henry A. Bullard was also a justice of the Louisiana Supreme Court (1834–39) and Secretary of State of Louisiana (1838–39). He was also a professor of civil law at the University of Louisiana Law School (1847), and served in the Louisiana House of Representatives (1850).

Death and burial 
He died in New Orleans and was interred at the Girod Street Cemetery. That burying ground was destroyed in 1959 and unclaimed remains were commingled with 15,000 others and deposited beneath Hope Mausoleum, St. John's Cemetery, New Orleans.

References

External links

Henry Adams Bullard entry at The Political Graveyard

1788 births
1851 deaths
People from Pepperell, Massachusetts
American people of English descent
National Republican Party members of the United States House of Representatives from Louisiana
Whig Party members of the United States House of Representatives from Louisiana
Secretaries of State of Louisiana
Members of the Louisiana House of Representatives
Justices of the Louisiana Supreme Court
U.S. state supreme court judges admitted to the practice of law by reading law
Louisiana lawyers
Harvard University alumni
Burials at Girod Street Cemetery
19th-century American judges
19th-century American lawyers